Kobolds are a fictional race of humanoid creatures, featured in the Dungeons & Dragons roleplaying game and other fantasy media. They are generally depicted as small reptilian humanoids with long tails, distantly related to dragons.

In fantasy roleplaying games, kobolds are often used as weak "cannon fodder" monsters, similar to goblins, but may be cunning and strong in groups.

Publication and depiction history
Kobolds appeared as monsters alongside goblins, orcs, and trolls in the 1971 wargame Chainmail, as part of Gary Gygax's "fantasy supplement" inspired by The Hobbit and other fantasy novels. This supplement inspired the first editions of Dungeons & Dragons (1974), where kobolds appear again. In these early appearances, they are only described as creatures similar to goblins.

Kobolds also featured as opponents in the very first playtest run by Gary Gygax for the original D&D rules in 1972.

Kobolds were first depicted as hairless humanoids with small horns in Gygax's Monster Manual (1977) for Advanced Dungeons & Dragons (AD&D), which describes them as aggressive, tribal creatures living in dark forests or subterranean settings.

In 1987, Roger E. Moore published the editorial "Tucker's kobolds" in the magazine Dragon, describing a game scenario where a horde of well-prepared kobolds uses guerrilla tactics to significantly challenge a far more powerful party of adventurers. This editorial became popular among roleplaying fans, and helped kobolds gain traction. The AD&D 2nd Edition Monstrous Manual (1993) introduced Urds, a race similar to kobolds with batlike wings.

Later editions of the game emphasized more draconic aspects, and suggest that kobolds are biologically related to dragons, and view them as an object of worship and servitude.  In the 3rd edition, the original kobolds were replaced henceforth by the new draconic ones.

A notable kobold character in media adaptations of Dungeons & Dragons is Deekin Scalesinger, an aspiring bard introduced in Shadows of Undrentide expansion pack for the role-playing video game Neverwinter Nights developed by BioWare. Deekin is originally a follower of the white dragon Tymofarrar, who orders Deekin's kin to travel to a small village called Hilltop located in the Silver Marches and attack a dwarven wizard named Drogan Droganson. Deekin encounters and assists the protagonist of Shadows of Undrentide, an apprentice of Drogan, and later persuades the adventurer to take him along as a traveling companion. Deekin returns as a henchman in the second Neverwinter Nights expansion pack, Hordes of the Underdark, where he is depicted as growing in power and stature, even manifesting dragon-like abilities and features as a Dragon Disciple. Deekin makes a cameo appearance in Neverwinter Nights II developed by Obsidian Entertainment.

Reception
 
 
Screen Rant compiled a list of the game's "10 Most Powerful (and 10 Weakest) Monsters, Ranked" in 2018, calling this one of the weakest, saying "When a dungeon master has run several low-level Dungeons & Dragons adventures, they will inevitably grow weary of using the same creatures from before and will want to shake things up. That's the moment when they prepare to paint over the serial numbers and replace the goblins with kobolds."

The kobold was considered one of the "five main 'humanoid' races" in AD&D by Paul Karczag and Lawrence Schick.

Journalist David M. Ewalt highlighted that kobolds have often been the first combat encounter for new players of Dungeons & Dragons, from its beginnings to the current 5th edition.

Kimberley Wallace of Game Informer considered Deekin to be one of best video game characters developed by BioWare.

References

Further reading
 
 
 Holian, Gary, Erik Mona, Sean K Reynolds, and Frederick Weining. Living Greyhawk Gazetteer. Renton, WA: Wizards of the Coast, 2000.
 Sargent, Carl. Monster Mythology. Lake Geneva, WI: TSR, 1992.

Dungeons & Dragons creatures from folklore and mythology
Dungeons & Dragons humanoids
Dungeons & Dragons monsters
Fictional goblins
Fictional kobolds
Fictional reptilians